Juan Carlos Dasque (born 12 October 1952) is an Argentine sport shooter who specializes in double trap and trap.

At the 2008 Olympic Games he finished in joint thirteenth place in the trap qualification, missing a place among the top six, who progressed to the final round.

References

1952 births
Living people
Argentine people of French descent
Argentine male sport shooters
Shooters at the 2008 Summer Olympics
Olympic shooters of Argentina
Trap and double trap shooters
Pan American Games gold medalists for Argentina
Pan American Games medalists in shooting
Shooters at the 2007 Pan American Games
Medalists at the 2007 Pan American Games
Place of birth missing (living people)